Samuel Christian Hollmann (1669 - 1787) was a German philosopher.

Background 
In 2020, Stephen Menn wrote that Hollman was critical of Gottfried Leibniz's theory of pre-established harmony.

Bibliography 

 De stupendo naturae mysterio, anima humana sibi ipsi ignota. Bossigel, Göttingen 1750. (Digitalisat Teil 1), (Teil 2,1), (Teil 2,2), (Teil 2,3), (Teil 2,4), (Teil 2,5)
 Commentatio Philosophica De Harmonia Inter Animam Et Corpus Praestabilita. Gerdes, Wittenberg 1724. (Digitalisat)
 Epistolae amoebaeae de harmonia praestabilita inter virum clarissimum Georg Bernh. Bülfingerum et Sam. Christ. Hollmannum junctim editae. Frankfurt und Leipzig 1738. (Digitalisat)
 Institutiones philosophicae. Bruhn, Wittenberg 1727–1734. 3 Teile. (Digitalisat Teil 1), (Teil 2)
 De reformatione philosophica condendisque libris in philosophia symbolicis dissertationes duae. Eichsfeld, Wittenberg 1730. (Digitalisat Band 1)
 De vera philosophiae notione, Eichsfeld, Wittenberg 1731, 1733. (Digitalisat der Ausg. 1731)
 Paulo Uberior in universam philosophiam introductio, Fritsch, Wittenberg 1734. (Digitalisat Band 2)
 Dissertatio Philosophica, De Definiendis Jvstis Scientiarvm Philosophicarvm Limitibvs.Hager, Göttingen 1736
 Philosophia rationalis, quae logica vulgo dicitur, paulo uberioris in universam philosophiam introductionis. Vandenhoeck, Göttingen 1746. (Digitalisat)
 Institutiones pneumatologiae et theologia naturalis, 1747
 Prima philosophia, qvae metaphysica vvlgo dicitvr, mvltvm avcta et emendata. Vandenhoeck, Göttingen 1747. (Digitalisat Teil 2)
 Philosophia moralis seu ethicae, Göttingen 1768
 Jurisprudentiae naturalis primae lineae. Vandenhoeck, Göttingen 1751 und 1768. (Digitalisat der Ausg. 1751)
 Illorum, que per universa philosophiam ab ipsomet reperta sunt, anacephalaiosis, Göttingen 1781
 Primæ Physicæ Experimentalis Lineæ . Hager, Göttingen 1742. (Digitalisat)
 Philosophiæ Natvralis Primæ Lineæ. Vandenhoeck, Göttingen 1749, 1753, 1766. (Digitalisat der Ausg. 1749)
 Sylloge Commentationum, Göttingen 1762, 1775, ed. nova 1784
 Zufälligen Gedanken über verschiedene Materien, 6. Sammlung 1776

References

External links 

 Virtual profile at The British Museum

1669 births
1787 deaths
Philosophers of mind
18th-century German philosophers
Naturalists
German naturalists
18th-century naturalists